Uchpili (Ösbülä) is a rural locality (a selo) and the administrative centre of Uchpilinsky Selsoviet, Dyurtyulinsky District, Bashkortostan, Russia. The population was 457 as of 2010. There are 8 streets.

Geography 
Uchpili is located 14 km southeast of Dyurtyuli (the district's administrative centre) by road. Ayukashevo is the nearest rural locality.

References 

Rural localities in Dyurtyulinsky District